Sengge Zangbo,
Sengge Khabab or Shiquan He is a river in the Ngari Prefecture in the Tibet Autonomous Region, China that is the source stream of the Indus river, one of the major trans-Himalayan rivers of Central and South Asia. Although it is thereafter called the Indus internationally, the Tibetans continue to regard the combined river to be Sênggê Zangbo as it flows into Ladakh.

The town of Shiquanhe, the administrative headquarters of the Ngari Prefecture, is located in the lower valley of Sengge Zangbo, and is named after the river. 

Main tributaries include Gar Tsangpo. Other tributaries include the Langqu River, the Chizuo Tsangpo River, and the Charinongqu River.

References

Bibliography

External links 
 Sengge river basin, OpenStreetMap, retrieved 11 September 2021.

Rivers of Tibet
Tributaries of the Indus River
Indus basin